Palaina xiphidium is a species of minute land snail with an operculum, a terrestrial gastropod mollusk or micromollusks in the family Diplommatinidae. This species is endemic to Micronesia.

References

X
Fauna of Micronesia
Molluscs of Oceania
Molluscs of the Pacific Ocean
Taxonomy articles created by Polbot